Calvin Coolidge (born John Calvin Coolidge Jr.; ; July 4, 1872January 5, 1933) was an American attorney and politician who served as the 30th president of the United States from 1923 to 1929. 

Born in Vermont, Coolidge was a Republican lawyer from New England who climbed up the ladder of Massachusetts state politics, becoming the state's 48th governor; his response to the Boston Police Strike of 1919 thrust him into the national spotlight as a man of decisive action. Coolidge was elected the country's 29th vice president the next year, succeeding the presidency upon the sudden death of President Warren G. Harding in 1923. Elected in his own right in 1924, Coolidge gained a reputation as a small-government conservative distinguished by a taciturn personality and dry sense of humor, receiving the nickname "Silent Cal". Though his widespread popularity enabled him to run for a second full term, he chose not to run again in 1928, remarking that ten years as president was (at the time) "longer than any other man has had ittoo long!"

Throughout his gubernatorial career, Coolidge ran on the record of fiscal conservatism, strong support for women's suffrage, and a vague opposition to Prohibition. During his presidency, he restored public confidence in the White House after the many scandals of the Harding administration. He signed into law the Indian Citizenship Act of 1924, which granted U.S. citizenship to all Native Americans, and oversaw a period of rapid and expansive economic growth known as the "Roaring Twenties", leaving office with considerable popularity. He was known for his hands-off governing approach and pro-business stances. As a Coolidge biographer wrote: "He embodied the spirit and hopes of the middle class, could interpret their longings and express their opinions. That he did represent the genius of the average is the most convincing proof of his strength."

Scholars have ranked Coolidge in the lower half of U.S. presidents. He gains almost universal praise for his stalwart support of racial equality during a period of heightened racial tension in the United States, and is highly praised by advocates of smaller government and laissez-faire economics, while supporters of an active central government generally view him far less favorably. His critics argue that he failed to use the country's economic boom to help struggling farmers and workers in other flailing industries, and there is still much debate among historians as to the extent to which Coolidge's economic policies contributed to the onset of the Great Depression.

Early life and family history
John Calvin Coolidge Jr. was born on July 4, 1872, in Plymouth Notch, Vermont—the only U.S. president to be born on Independence Day. He was the elder of the two children of John Calvin Coolidge Sr. (1845–1926) and Victoria Josephine Moor (1846–1885). Although named for his father, John, from early childhood Coolidge was addressed by his middle name, Calvin. His middle name was selected in honor of John Calvin, a founder of the Congregational church in which Coolidge was raised and remained active throughout his life.

Coolidge Senior engaged in many occupations and developed a statewide reputation as a prosperous farmer, storekeeper, and public servant. He held various local offices, including justice of the peace and tax collector and served in the Vermont House of Representatives as well as the Vermont Senate. Coolidge's mother was the daughter of Hiram Dunlap Moor, a Plymouth Notch farmer and Abigail Franklin. She was chronically ill and died at the age of 39, perhaps from tuberculosis, when Coolidge was 12 years old. His younger sister, Abigail Grace Coolidge (1875–1890), died at the age of 15, probably of appendicitis, when Coolidge was 18. Coolidge's father married a Plymouth schoolteacher in 1891, and lived to the age of 80.

Coolidge's family had deep roots in New England. His earliest American ancestor, John Coolidge, emigrated from Cottenham, Cambridgeshire, England, around 1630 and settled in Watertown, Massachusetts. Coolidge's great-great-grandfather, also named John Coolidge, was an American military officer in the Revolutionary War and one of the first selectmen of the town of Plymouth. His grandfather Calvin Galusha Coolidge served in the Vermont House of Representatives. Coolidge was also a descendant of Samuel Appleton, who settled in Ipswich and led the Massachusetts Bay Colony during King Philip's War.

Early career and marriage

Education and law practice

Coolidge attended the Black River Academy and then St. Johnsbury Academy before enrolling at Amherst College, where he distinguished himself in the debating class. As a senior, he joined the Phi Gamma Delta fraternity and graduated cum laude. While at Amherst, Coolidge was profoundly influenced by philosophy professor Charles Edward Garman—a Congregational mystic who had a neo-Hegelian philosophy.

Coolidge explained Garman's ethics forty years later:
[T]here is a standard of righteousness that might does not make right, that the end does not justify the means, and that expediency as a working principle is bound to fail. The only hope of perfecting human relationships is in accordance with the law of service under which men are not so solicitous about what they shall get as they are about what they shall give. Yet people are entitled to the rewards of their industry. What they earn is theirs, no matter how small or how great. But the possession of property carries the obligation to use it in a larger service...

At his father's urging after graduation, Coolidge moved to Northampton, Massachusetts, to become a lawyer. Coolidge followed the common practice of apprenticing with a local law firm, Hammond & Field, and reading law with them. John C. Hammond and Henry P. Field, both Amherst graduates, introduced Coolidge to practicing law in the county seat of Hampshire County, Massachusetts. In 1897, Coolidge was admitted to the Massachusetts bar, becoming a country lawyer. With his savings and a small inheritance from his grandfather, Coolidge opened his own law office in Northampton in 1898. He practiced commercial law, believing that he served his clients best by staying out of court. As his reputation as a hard-working and diligent attorney grew, local banks and other businesses began to retain his services.

Marriage and family

In 1903, Coolidge met Grace Goodhue, a graduate of the University of Vermont and a teacher at Northampton's Clarke School for the Deaf. They married on October 4, 1905, at 2:30 p.m. in a small ceremony which took place in the parlor of Grace's family's house, having overcome her mother's objections to the marriage. The newlyweds went on a honeymoon trip to Montreal, originally planned for two weeks but cut short by a week at Coolidge's request. After 25 years he wrote of Grace, "for almost a quarter of a century she has borne with my infirmities and I have rejoiced in her graces".

The Coolidges had two sons: John (1906–2000) and Calvin Jr. (1908–1924). On June 30, 1924, Calvin Jr. had played tennis with his brother on the White House tennis courts without putting on socks and developed a blister on one of his toes. The blister subsequently degenerated into sepsis. Calvin Jr. died a little over a week later at the age of 16. The President never forgave himself for Calvin Jr's death. His eldest son John said it "hurt [Coolidge] terribly", and psychiatric biographer Robert E. Gilbert, author of  The Tormented President: Calvin Coolidge, Death, and Clinical Depression, said that Coolidge "ceased to function as President after the death of his sixteen-year-old son". Gilbert explains in his book how Coolidge displayed all ten of the symptoms listed by the American Psychiatric Association as evidence of major depressive disorder following Calvin Jr.'s sudden death. John later became a railroad executive, helped to start the Coolidge Foundation, and was instrumental in creating the President Calvin Coolidge State Historic Site.

Coolidge was frugal, and when it came to securing a home, he insisted upon renting. He and his wife attended Northampton's Edwards Congregational Church before and after his presidency.

Local political office (1898−1915)

City offices
The Republican Party was dominant in New England at the time, and Coolidge followed the example of Hammond and Field by becoming active in local politics. In 1896, Coolidge campaigned for Republican presidential candidate William McKinley, and was selected to be a member of the Republican City Committee the next year. In 1898, he won election to the City Council of Northampton, placing second in a ward where the top three candidates were elected. The position offered no salary but provided Coolidge with valuable political experience. In 1899, he was chosen City Solicitor by the City Council. He was elected for a one-year term in 1900, and reelected in 1901. This position gave Coolidge more experience as a lawyer and paid a salary of $600. In 1902, the city council selected a Democrat for city solicitor, and Coolidge returned to private practice. Soon thereafter, however, the clerk of courts for the county died, and Coolidge was chosen to replace him. The position paid well, but it barred him from practicing law, so he remained at the job for only one year. In 1904, Coolidge suffered his sole defeat at the ballot box, losing an election to the Northampton school board. When told that some of his neighbors voted against him because he had no children in the schools he would govern, the recently married Coolidge replied, "Might give me time!"

Massachusetts state legislator and mayor

In 1906, the local Republican committee nominated Coolidge for election to the Massachusetts House of Representatives. He won a close victory over the incumbent Democrat, and reported to Boston for the 1907 session of the Massachusetts General Court. In his freshman term, Coolidge served on minor committees and, although he usually voted with the party, was known as a Progressive Republican, voting in favor of such measures as women's suffrage and the direct election of Senators. While in Boston, Coolidge became an ally, and then a liegeman, of then U.S. Senator Winthrop Murray Crane who controlled the western faction of the Massachusetts Republican Party; Crane's party rival in the east of the commonwealth was U.S. Senator Henry Cabot Lodge. Coolidge forged another key strategic alliance with Guy Currier, who had served in both state houses and had the social distinction, wealth, personal charm and broad circle of friends which Coolidge lacked, and which would have a lasting impact on his political career. In 1907, he was elected to a second term, and in the 1908 session Coolidge was more outspoken, though not in a leadership position.

Instead of vying for another term in the State House, Coolidge returned home to his growing family and ran for mayor of Northampton when the incumbent Democrat retired. He was well liked in the town, and defeated his challenger by a vote of 1,597 to 1,409. During his first term (1910 to 1911), he increased teachers' salaries and retired some of the city's debt while still managing to effect a slight tax decrease. He was renominated in 1911, and defeated the same opponent by a slightly larger margin.

In 1911, the State Senator for the Hampshire County area retired and successfully encouraged Coolidge to run for his seat for the 1912 session; Coolidge defeated his Democratic opponent by a large margin. At the start of that term, he became chairman of a committee to arbitrate the "Bread and Roses" strike by the workers of the American Woolen Company in Lawrence, Massachusetts. After two tense months, the company agreed to the workers' demands, in a settlement proposed by the committee. A major issue affecting Massachusetts Republicans that year was the party split between the progressive wing, which favored Theodore Roosevelt, and the conservative wing, which favored William Howard Taft. Although he favored some progressive measures, Coolidge refused to leave the Republican party. When the new Progressive Party declined to run a candidate in his state senate district, Coolidge won reelection against his Democratic opponent by an increased margin.

In the 1913 session, Coolidge enjoyed renowned success in arduously navigating to passage the Western Trolley Act, which connected Northampton with a dozen similar industrial communities in western Massachusetts. Coolidge intended to retire after his second term as was the custom, but when the president of the state senate, Levi H. Greenwood, considered running for lieutenant governor, Coolidge decided to run again for the Senate in the hopes of being elected as its presiding officer. Although Greenwood later decided to run for reelection to the Senate, he was defeated primarily due to his opposition to women's suffrage; Coolidge was in favor of the women's vote, won his re-election, and with Crane's help, assumed the presidency of a closely divided Senate. After his election in January 1914, Coolidge delivered a published and frequently quoted speech entitled Have Faith in Massachusetts, which summarized his philosophy of government.

Coolidge's speech was well received, and he attracted some admirers on its account; towards the end of the term, many of them were proposing his name for nomination to lieutenant governor. After winning reelection to the Senate by an increased margin in the 1914 elections, Coolidge was reelected unanimously to be President of the Senate. Coolidge's supporters, led by fellow Amherst alumnus Frank Stearns, encouraged him again to run for lieutenant governor. Stearns, an executive with the Boston department store R. H. Stearns, became another key ally, and began a publicity campaign on Coolidge's behalf before he announced his candidacy at the end of the 1915 legislative session.

Lieutenant Governor and Governor of Massachusetts (1916−1921)

Coolidge entered the primary election for lieutenant governor and was nominated to run alongside gubernatorial candidate Samuel W. McCall. Coolidge was the leading vote-getter in the Republican primary, and balanced the Republican ticket by adding a western presence to McCall's eastern base of support. McCall and Coolidge won the 1915 election to their respective one-year terms, with Coolidge defeating his opponent by more than 50,000 votes.

In Massachusetts, the lieutenant governor does not preside over the state Senate, as is the case in many other states; nevertheless, as lieutenant governor, Coolidge was a deputy governor functioning as an administrative inspector and was a member of the governor's council. He was also chairman of the finance committee and the pardons committee. As a full-time elected official, Coolidge discontinued his law practice in 1916, though his family continued to live in Northampton. McCall and Coolidge were both reelected in 1916 and again in 1917. When McCall decided that he would not stand for a fourth term, Coolidge announced his intention to run for governor.

1918 election
Coolidge was unopposed for the Republican nomination for Governor of Massachusetts in 1918. He and his running mate, Channing Cox, a Boston lawyer and Speaker of the Massachusetts House of Representatives, ran on the previous administration's record: fiscal conservatism, a vague opposition to Prohibition, support for women's suffrage, and support for American involvement in World War I. The issue of the war proved divisive, especially among Irish and German Americans. Coolidge was elected by a margin of 16,773 votes over his opponent, Richard H. Long, in the smallest margin of victory of any of his statewide campaigns.

Boston Police Strike

In 1919, in reaction to a plan of the policemen of the Boston Police Department to register with a union, Police Commissioner Edwin U. Curtis announced that such an act would not be tolerated. In August of that year, the American Federation of Labor issued a charter to the Boston Police Union. Curtis declared the union's leaders were guilty of insubordination and would be relieved of duty, but indicated he would cancel their suspension if the union was dissolved by September 4. The mayor of Boston, Andrew Peters, convinced Curtis to delay his action for a few days, but with no results, and Curtis suspended the union leaders on September 8. The following day, about three-quarters of the policemen in Boston went on strike. Coolidge, tacitly but fully in support of Curtis' position, closely monitored the situation but initially deferred to the local authorities. He anticipated that only a resulting measure of lawlessness could sufficiently prompt the public to understand and appreciate the controlling principlethat a policeman does not strike. That night and the next, there was sporadic violence and rioting in the unruly city. Peters, concerned about sympathy strikes by the firemen and others, called up some units of the Massachusetts National Guard stationed in the Boston area pursuant to an old and obscure legal authority, and relieved Curtis of duty.

Coolidge, sensing the severity of circumstances were then in need of his intervention, conferred with Crane's operative, William Butler, and then acted. He called up more units of the National Guard, restored Curtis to office, and took personal control of the police force. Curtis proclaimed that all of the strikers were fired from their jobs, and Coolidge called for a new police force to be recruited.
That night Coolidge received a telegram from AFL leader Samuel Gompers. "Whatever disorder has occurred", Gompers wrote, "is due to Curtis's order in which the right of the policemen has been denied…" Coolidge publicly answered Gompers's telegram, denying any justification whatsoever for the strikeand his response launched him into the national consciousness. Newspapers across the nation picked up on Coolidge's statement and he became the newest hero to opponents of the strike. Amid of the First Red Scare, many Americans were terrified of the spread of communist revolutions, like those that had taken place in Russia, Hungary, and Germany. While Coolidge had lost some friends among organized labor, conservatives across the nation had seen a rising star. Although he usually acted with deliberation, the Boston police strike gave him a national reputation as a decisive leader, and as a strict enforcer of law and order.

1919 election

Coolidge and Cox were renominated for their respective offices in 1919. By this time Coolidge's supporters (especially Stearns) had publicized his actions in the Police Strike around the state and the nation and some of Coolidge's speeches were published in book form. He faced the same opponent as in 1918, Richard Long, but this time Coolidge defeated him by 125,101 votes, more than seven times his margin of victory from a year earlier. His actions in the police strike, combined with the massive electoral victory, led to suggestions that Coolidge run for president in 1920.

Legislation and vetoes as governor
By the time Coolidge was inaugurated on January 2, 1919, the First World War had ended, and Coolidge pushed the legislature to give a $100 bonus to Massachusetts veterans. He also signed a bill reducing the work week for women and children from fifty-four hours to forty-eight, saying, "We must humanize the industry, or the system will break down." He signed into law a budget that kept the tax rates the same, while trimming $4 million from expenditures, thus allowing the state to retire some of its debt.

Coolidge also wielded the veto pen as governor. His most publicized veto prevented an increase in legislators' pay by 50%. Although Coolidge was personally opposed to Prohibition, he vetoed a bill in May 1920 that would have allowed the sale of beer or wine of 2.75% alcohol or less, in Massachusetts in violation of the Eighteenth Amendment to the United States Constitution. "Opinions and instructions do not outmatch the Constitution," he said in his veto message. "Against it, they are void."

Vice presidency (1921−1923)

1920 election

At the 1920 Republican National Convention, most of the delegates were selected by state party caucuses, not primaries. As such, the field was divided among many local favorites. Coolidge was one such candidate, and while he placed as high as sixth in the voting, the powerful party bosses running the convention, primarily the party's U.S. Senators, never considered him seriously. After ten ballots, the bosses and then the delegates settled on Senator Warren G. Harding of Ohio as their nominee for president. When the time came to select a vice presidential nominee, the bosses also made and announced their decision on whom they wantedSen. Irvine Lenroot of Wisconsinand then prematurely departed after his name was put forth, relying on the rank and file to confirm their decision. A delegate from Oregon, Wallace McCamant, having read Have Faith in Massachusetts, proposed Coolidge for vice president instead. The suggestion caught on quickly with the masses starving for an act of independence from the absent bosses, and Coolidge was unexpectedly nominated.

The Democrats nominated another Ohioan, James M. Cox, for president and the Assistant Secretary of the Navy, Franklin D. Roosevelt, for vice president. The question of the United States joining the League of Nations was a major issue in the campaign, as was the unfinished legacy of Progressivism. Harding ran a "front-porch" campaign from his home in Marion, Ohio, but Coolidge took to the campaign trail in the Upper South, New York, and New Englandhis audiences carefully limited to those familiar with Coolidge and those placing a premium upon concise and short speeches. On November 2, 1920, Harding and Coolidge were victorious in a landslide, winning more than 60 percent of the popular vote, including every state outside the South. They also won in Tennessee, the first time a Republican ticket had won a Southern state since Reconstruction.

"Silent Cal"

The U.S. vice-presidency did not carry many official duties, but Coolidge was invited by President Harding to attend cabinet meetings, making him the first vice president to do so. He gave a number of unremarkable speeches around the country.

As vice president, Coolidge and his vivacious wife Grace were invited to quite a few parties, where the legend of "Silent Cal" was born. It is from this time that most of the jokes and anecdotes involving Coolidge originate, such as Coolidge being "silent in five languages". Although Coolidge was known to be a skilled and effective public speaker, in private he was a man of few words and was commonly referred to as "Silent Cal". An apocryphal story has it that a person seated next to him at a dinner said to him, "I made a bet today that I could get more than two words out of you." He replied, "You lose." However, on April 22, 1924, Coolidge himself said that the "You lose" quotation never occurred. The story about it was related by Frank B. Noyes, President of the Associated Press, to their membership at their annual luncheon at the Waldorf Astoria Hotel, when toasting and introducing Coolidge, who was the invited speaker. After the introduction and before his prepared remarks, Coolidge said to the membership, "Your President [referring to Noyes] has given you a perfect example of one of those rumors now current in Washington which is without any foundation."

Coolidge often seemed uncomfortable among fashionable Washington society; when asked why he continued to attend so many of their dinner parties, he replied, "Got to eat somewhere." Alice Roosevelt Longworth, a leading Republican wit, underscored Coolidge's silence and his dour personality: "When he wished he were elsewhere, he pursed his lips, folded his arms, and said nothing. He looked then precisely as though he had been weaned on a pickle." Coolidge and his wife, Grace, who was a great baseball fan, once attended a Washington Senators game and sat through all nine innings without saying a word, except once when he asked her the time.

As president, Coolidge's reputation as a quiet man continued. "The words of a President have an enormous weight," he would later write, "and ought not to be used indiscriminately." Coolidge was aware of his stiff reputation; indeed, he cultivated it. "I think the American people want a solemn ass as a President," he once told Ethel Barrymore, "and I think I will go along with them." Some historians suggest that Coolidge's image was created deliberately as a campaign tactic, while others believe his withdrawn and quiet behavior to be natural, deepening after the death of his son in 1924. Dorothy Parker, upon learning that Coolidge had died, reportedly remarked, "How can they tell?"

Presidency (1923−1929)

On August 2, 1923, President Harding died unexpectedly from a heart attack in San Francisco while on a speaking tour of the western United States. Vice President Coolidge was in Vermont visiting his family home, which had neither electricity nor a telephone, when he received word by messenger of Harding's death. Coolidge dressed, said a prayer, and came downstairs to greet the reporters who had assembled. His father, a notary public and justice of the peace, administered the oath of office in the family's parlor by the light of a kerosene lamp at 2:47 a.m. on August 3, 1923, whereupon the new President of the United States returned to bed.

Coolidge returned to Washington the next day, and was sworn in again by Justice Adolph A. Hoehling Jr. of the Supreme Court of the District of Columbia, to forestall any questions about the authority of a state official to administer a federal oath. This second oath-taking remained a secret until it was revealed by Harry M. Daugherty in 1932, and confirmed by Hoehling. When Hoehling confirmed Daugherty's story, he indicated that Daugherty, then serving as United States Attorney General, asked him to administer the oath without fanfare at the Willard Hotel. According to Hoehling, he did not question Daugherty's reason for requesting a second oath-taking but assumed it was to resolve any doubt about whether the first swearing-in was valid.

The nation initially did not know what to make of Coolidge, who had maintained a low profile in the Harding administration; many had even expected him to be replaced on the ballot in 1924. Coolidge believed that those of Harding's men under suspicion were entitled to every presumption of innocence, taking a methodical approach to the scandals, principally the Teapot Dome scandal, while others clamored for rapid punishment of those they presumed guilty. Coolidge thought the Senate investigations of the scandals would suffice; this was affirmed by the resulting resignations of those involved. He personally intervened in demanding the resignation of Attorney General Harry M. Daugherty after he refused to cooperate with the congressional probe. He then set about to confirm that no loose ends remained in the administration, arranging for a full briefing on the wrongdoing. Harry A. Slattery reviewed the facts with him, Harlan F. Stone analyzed the legal aspects for him and Senator William E. Borah assessed and presented the political factors.

Coolidge addressed Congress when it reconvened on December 6, 1923, giving a speech that supported many of Harding's policies, including Harding's formal budgeting process, the enforcement of immigration restrictions and arbitration of coal strikes ongoing in Pennsylvania. The address to Congress was the first presidential speech to be broadcast over the radio. The Washington Naval Treaty was proclaimed just one month into Coolidge's term, and was generally well received in the country. In May 1924, the World War I veterans' World War Adjusted Compensation Act or "Bonus Bill" was passed over his veto. Coolidge signed the Immigration Act later that year, which was aimed at restricting southern and eastern European immigration, but appended a signing statement expressing his unhappiness with the bill's specific exclusion of Japanese immigrants. Just before the Republican Convention began, Coolidge signed into law the Revenue Act of 1924, which reduced the top marginal tax rate from 58% to 46%, as well as personal income tax rates across the board, increased the estate tax and bolstered it with a new gift tax.

On June 2, 1924, Coolidge signed the act granting citizenship to all Native Americans born in the United States. By that time, two-thirds of them were already citizens, having gained it through marriage, military service (veterans of World War I were granted citizenship in 1919), or the land allotments that had earlier taken place.

1924 election

The Republican Convention was held on June 10–12, 1924, in Cleveland, Ohio; Coolidge was nominated on the first ballot. The convention nominated Frank Lowden of Illinois for vice president on the second ballot, but he declined; former Brigadier General Charles G. Dawes was nominated on the third ballot and accepted.

The Democrats held their convention the next month in New York City. The convention soon deadlocked, and after 103 ballots, the delegates finally agreed on a compromise candidate, John W. Davis, with Charles W. Bryan nominated for vice president. The Democrats' hopes were buoyed when Robert M. La Follette, a Republican senator from Wisconsin, split from the GOP to form a new Progressive Party. Many believed that the split in the Republican party, like the one in 1912, would allow a Democrat to win the presidency.

After the conventions and the death of his younger son Calvin, Coolidge became withdrawn; he later said that "when he [the son] died, the power and glory of the Presidency went with him." Even as he mourned, Coolidge ran his standard campaign, not mentioning his opponents by name or maligning them, and delivering speeches on his theory of government, including several that were broadcast over the radio. It was the most subdued campaign since 1896, partly because of Coolidge's grief, but also because of his naturally non-confrontational style. The other candidates campaigned in a more modern fashion, but despite the split in the Republican party, the results were similar to those of 1920. Coolidge and Dawes won every state outside the South except Wisconsin, La Follette's home state. Coolidge won the election with 382 electoral votes and the popular vote by 2.5 million over his opponents' combined total.

Industry and trade

During Coolidge's presidency, the United States experienced a period of rapid economic growth known as the "Roaring Twenties". He left the administration's industrial policy in the hands of his activist Secretary of Commerce, Herbert Hoover, who energetically used government auspices to promote business efficiency and develop airlines and radio. Coolidge disdained regulation and demonstrated this by appointing commissioners to the Federal Trade Commission and the Interstate Commerce Commission who did little to restrict the activities of businesses under their jurisdiction. The regulatory state under Coolidge was, as one biographer described it, "thin to the point of invisibility".

Historian Robert Sobel offers some context of Coolidge's laissez-faire ideology, based on the prevailing understanding of federalism during his presidency: "As Governor of Massachusetts, Coolidge supported wages and hours legislation, opposed child labor, imposed economic controls during World War I, favored safety measures in factories, and even worker representation on corporate boards. Did he support these measures while president? No, because in the 1920s, such matters were considered the responsibilities of state and local governments." However, Coolidge did sign the Radio Act of 1927 into law that established the Federal Radio Commission (1927–1934), the equal-time rule for radio broadcasters in the United States, and restricted radio broadcasting licenses to stations that demonstrated that they served "the public interest, convenience, or necessity".

Taxation and government spending
Coolidge adopted the taxation policies of his Secretary of the Treasury, Andrew Mellon, who advocated "scientific taxation"the notion that lowering taxes will increase, rather than decrease, government receipts. Congress agreed, and tax rates were reduced in Coolidge's term. In addition to federal tax cuts, Coolidge proposed reductions in federal expenditures and retiring of the federal debt. Coolidge's ideas were shared by the Republicans in Congress, and in 1924, Congress passed the Revenue Act of 1924, which reduced income tax rates and eliminated all income taxation for some two million people. They reduced taxes again by passing the Revenue Acts of 1926 and 1928, all the while continuing to keep spending down so as to reduce the overall federal debt. By 1927, only the wealthiest 2% of taxpayers paid any federal income tax. Federal spending remained flat during Coolidge's administration, allowing one-fourth of the federal debt to be retired in total. State and local governments saw considerable growth, however, surpassing the federal budget in 1927. By 1929, after Coolidge's series of tax rate reductions had cut the tax rate to 24 percent on those making over $100,000, the federal government collected more than a billion dollars in income taxes, of which 65 percent was collected from those making over $100,000. In 1921, when the tax rate on people making over $100,000 a year was 73 percent, the federal government collected a little over $700 million in income taxes, of which 30 percent was paid by those making over $100,000.

Opposition to farm subsidies

Perhaps the most contentious issue of Coolidge's presidency was relief for farmers. Some in Congress proposed a bill designed to fight falling agricultural prices by allowing the federal government to purchase crops to sell abroad at lower prices. Agriculture Secretary Henry C. Wallace and other administration officials favored the bill when it was introduced in 1924, but rising prices convinced many in Congress that the bill was unnecessary, and it was defeated just before the elections that year. In 1926, with farm prices falling once more, Senator Charles L. McNary and Representative Gilbert N. Haugenboth Republicansproposed the McNary–Haugen Farm Relief Bill. The bill proposed a federal farm board that would purchase surplus production in high-yield years and hold it (when feasible) for later sale or sell it abroad. Coolidge opposed McNary-Haugen, declaring that agriculture must stand "on an independent business basis", and said that "government control cannot be divorced from political control." Instead of manipulating prices, he favored instead Herbert Hoover's proposal to increase profitability by modernizing agriculture. Secretary Mellon wrote a letter denouncing the McNary-Haugen measure as unsound and likely to cause inflation, and it was defeated.

After McNary-Haugen's defeat, Coolidge supported a less radical measure, the Curtis-Crisp Act, which would have created a federal board to lend money to farm co-operatives in times of surplus; the bill did not pass. In February 1927, Congress took up the McNary-Haugen bill again, this time narrowly passing it, and Coolidge vetoed it. In his veto message, he expressed the belief that the bill would do nothing to help farmers, benefiting only exporters and expanding the federal bureaucracy. Congress did not override the veto, but it passed the bill again in May 1928 by an increased majority; again, Coolidge vetoed it. "Farmers never have made much money," said Coolidge, the Vermont farmer's son. "I do not believe we can do much about it."

Flood control
Coolidge has often been criticized for his actions during the Great Mississippi Flood of 1927, the worst natural disaster to hit the Gulf Coast until Hurricane Katrina in 2005. Although he did eventually name Secretary Hoover to a commission in charge of flood relief, scholars argue that Coolidge overall showed a lack of interest in federal flood control. Coolidge did not believe that personally visiting the region after the floods would accomplish anything, and that it would be seen as mere political grandstanding. He also did not want to incur the federal spending that flood control would require; he believed property owners should bear much of the cost. On the other hand, Congress wanted a bill that would place the federal government completely in charge of flood mitigation. When Congress passed a compromise measure in 1928, Coolidge declined to take credit for it and signed the bill in private on May 15.

Civil rights

According to one biographer, Coolidge was "devoid of racial prejudice", but rarely took the lead on civil rights. Coolidge disliked the Ku Klux Klan and no Klansman is known to have received an appointment from him. In the 1924 presidential election his opponents (Robert La Follette and John Davis), and his running mate Charles Dawes, often attacked the Klan but Coolidge avoided the subject. During his administration, lynchings of African-Americans decreased and millions of people left the Ku Klux Klan.

Coolidge spoke in favor of the civil rights of African Americans, saying in his first State of the Union address that their rights were "just as sacred as those of any other citizen" under the U.S. Constitution and that it was a "public and a private duty to protect those rights."

Coolidge repeatedly called for laws to make lynching a federal crime (it was already a state crime, though not always enforced). Congress refused to pass any such legislation. On June 2, 1924, Coolidge signed the Indian Citizenship Act, which granted U.S. citizenship to all Native Americans living on reservations. (Those off reservations had long been citizens.)  On June 6, 1924, Coolidge delivered a commencement address at historically black, non-segregated Howard University, in which he thanked and commended African Americans for their rapid advances in education and their contributions to U.S. society over the years, as well as their eagerness to render their services as soldiers in the World War, all while being faced with discrimination and prejudices at home.

In a speech in October 1924, Coolidge stressed tolerance of differences as an American value and thanked immigrants for their contributions to U.S. society, saying that they have "contributed much to making our country what it is." He stated that although the diversity of peoples was a detrimental source of conflict and tension in Europe, it was peculiar for the United States that it was a "harmonious" benefit for the country. Coolidge further stated the United States should assist and help immigrants who come to the country and urged immigrants to reject "race hatreds" and "prejudices".

Foreign policy

Coolidge was neither well versed nor very interested in world affairs. His focus was directed mainly at American business, especially pertaining to trade, and "Maintaining the Status Quo". Although not an isolationist, he was reluctant to enter into European involvements. While Coolidge believed strongly in a non-interventionist foreign policy, he did believe that the United States was exceptional.

Coolidge considered the 1920 Republican victory as a rejection of the Wilsonian position that the United States should join the League of Nations. Coolidge believed the League did not serve American interests. However, he spoke in favor of joining the Permanent Court of International Justice (World Court), provided that the nation would not be bound by advisory decisions. In 1926, the Senate eventually approved joining the Court (with reservations). The League of Nations accepted the reservations, but it suggested some modifications of its own. The Senate failed to act and so the United States did not join the World Court.

Coolidge authorized the Dawes Plan, a financial plan by Charles Dawes, to provide Germany partial relief from its reparations obligations from World War I. The plan initially provided stimulus for the German economy. Additionally, Coolidge attempted to pursue further curbs on naval strength following the early successes of Harding's Washington Naval Conference by sponsoring the Geneva Naval Conference in 1927, which failed owing to a French and Italian boycott and ultimate failure of Great Britain and the United States to agree on cruiser tonnages. As a result, the conference was a failure and Congress eventually authorized for increased American naval spending in 1928. The Kellogg–Briand Pact of 1928, named for Coolidge's Secretary of State, Frank B. Kellogg, and French foreign minister Aristide Briand, was also a key peacekeeping initiative. The treaty, ratified in 1929, committed signatoriesthe United States, the United Kingdom, France, Germany, Italy, and Japanto "renounce war, as an instrument of national policy in their relations with one another". The treaty did not achieve its intended resultthe outlawry of warbut it did provide the founding principle for international law after World War II. Coolidge also continued the previous administration's policy of withholding recognition of the Soviet Union.

Efforts were made to normalize ties with post-Revolution Mexico. Coolidge recognized Mexico's new governments under Álvaro Obregón and Plutarco Elías Calles, and continued American support for the elected Mexican government against the National League for the Defense of Religious Liberty during the Cristero War, lifting the arms embargo on that country; he also appointed Dwight Morrow as Ambassador to Mexico with the successful objective to avoid further American conflict with Mexico.

Coolidge's administration would see continuity in the occupation of Nicaragua and Haiti, and an end to the occupation of the Dominican Republic in 1924 as a result of withdrawal agreements finalized during Harding's administration. In 1925, Coolidge ordered the withdrawal of Marines stationed in Nicaragua following perceived stability after the 1924 Nicaraguan general election, but redeployed them there in January 1927 following failed attempts to peacefully resolve the rapid deterioration of political stability and avert the ensuing Constitutionalist War; Henry L. Stimson was later sent by Coolidge to mediate a peace deal that would end the civil war and extend American military presence in Nicaragua beyond Coolidge's term in office.

To extend an olive branch to Latin American leaders embittered over America's interventionist policies in Central America and the Caribbean, Coolidge led the U.S. delegation to the Sixth International Conference of American States, January 15–17, 1928, in Havana, Cuba, the only international trip Coolidge made during his presidency. He would be the last sitting American president to visit Cuba until Barack Obama in 2016.

For Canada, Coolidge authorized the St. Lawrence Seaway, a system of locks and canals that would provide large vessels passage between the Atlantic Ocean and the Great Lakes.

Cabinet

Although a few of Harding's cabinet appointees were scandal-tarred, Coolidge initially retained all of them, out of an ardent conviction that as successor to a deceased elected president he was obligated to retain Harding's counselors and policies until the next election. He kept Harding's able speechwriter Judson T. Welliver; Stuart Crawford replaced Welliver in November 1925. Coolidge appointed C. Bascom Slemp, a Virginia Congressman and experienced federal politician, to work jointly with Edward T. Clark, a Massachusetts Republican organizer whom he retained from his vice-presidential staff, as Secretaries to the President (a position equivalent to the modern White House Chief of Staff).

Perhaps the most powerful person in Coolidge's Cabinet was Secretary of the Treasury Andrew Mellon, who controlled the administration's financial policies and was regarded by many, including House Minority Leader John Nance Garner, as more powerful than Coolidge himself. Secretary of Commerce Herbert Hoover also held a prominent place in Coolidge's Cabinet, in part because Coolidge found value in Hoover's ability to win positive publicity with his pro-business proposals. Secretary of State Charles Evans Hughes directed Coolidge's foreign policy until he resigned in 1925 following Coolidge's re-election. He was replaced by Frank B. Kellogg, who had previously served as a senator and as the ambassador to Great Britain. Coolidge made two other appointments following his re-election, with William M. Jardine taking the position of Secretary of Agriculture and John G. Sargent becoming Attorney General. Coolidge did not have a vice president during his first term, but Charles Dawes became vice president during Coolidge's second term, and Dawes and Coolidge clashed over farm policy and other issues.

Judicial appointments

Coolidge appointed one justice to the Supreme Court of the United States, Harlan F. Stone in 1925. Stone was Coolidge's fellow Amherst alumnus, a Wall Street lawyer and conservative Republican. Stone was serving as dean of Columbia Law School when Coolidge appointed him to be attorney general in 1924 to restore the reputation tarnished by Harding's Attorney General, Harry M. Daugherty. It does not appear that Coolidge considered appointing anyone other than Stone, although Stone himself had urged Coolidge to appoint Benjamin N. Cardozo. Stone proved to be a firm believer in judicial restraint and was regarded as one of the court's three liberal justices who would often vote to uphold New Deal legislation. President Franklin D. Roosevelt later appointed Stone to be chief justice.

Coolidge nominated 17 judges to the United States Courts of Appeals and 61 judges to the United States district courts. He appointed judges to various specialty courts as well, including Genevieve R. Cline, who became the first woman named to the federal judiciary when Coolidge placed her on the United States Customs Court in 1928. Coolidge also signed the Judiciary Act of 1925 into law, allowing the Supreme Court more discretion over its workload.

1928 election

In the summer of 1927, Coolidge vacationed in the Black Hills of South Dakota, where he engaged in horseback riding and fly fishing and attended rodeos. He made Custer State Park his "summer White House". While on vacation, Coolidge surprisingly issued a terse statement that he would not seek a second full term as president: "I do not choose to run for President in 1928." After allowing the reporters to take that in, Coolidge elaborated. "If I take another term, I will be in the White House till 1933 … Ten years in Washington is longer than any other man has had ittoo long!" In his memoirs, Coolidge explained his decision not to run: "The Presidential office takes a heavy toll of those who occupy it and those who are dear to them. While we should not refuse to spend and be spent in the service of our country, it is hazardous to attempt what we feel is beyond our strength to accomplish." After leaving office, he and Grace returned to Northampton, where he wrote his memoirs. The Republicans retained the White House in 1928 with a landslide by Herbert Hoover. Coolidge had been reluctant to endorse Hoover as his successor; on one occasion he remarked that "for six years that man has given me unsolicited adviceall of it bad." Even so, Coolidge had no desire to split the party by publicly opposing the nomination of the popular commerce secretary.

Post-presidency (1929–1933)

After his presidency, Coolidge retired to a spacious home in Northampton, "The Beeches". He kept a Hacker runabout boat on the Connecticut River and was often observed on the water by local boating enthusiasts. During this period, he also served as chairman of the Non-Partisan Railroad Commission, an entity created by several banks and corporations to survey the country's long-term transportation needs and make recommendations for improvements. He was an honorary president of the American Foundation for the Blind, a director of New York Life Insurance Company, president of the American Antiquarian Society, and a trustee of Amherst College.

Coolidge published his autobiography in 1929 and wrote a syndicated newspaper column, "Calvin Coolidge Says", from 1930 to 1931. Faced with a Democratic landslide in the 1932 presidential election, some Republicans spoke of rejecting Hoover as their party's nominee, and instead drafting Coolidge to run. Coolidge made it clear that he was not interested in running again, and that he would publicly repudiate any effort to draft him. Hoover was renominated, and Coolidge made several radio addresses in support of him. Hoover then lost the general election to Coolidge's 1920 vice presidential Democratic opponent Franklin D. Roosevelt in a landslide.

Death

Coolidge died suddenly from coronary thrombosis at "The Beeches" on January 5, 1933, at 12:45 p.m., aged 60. Shortly before his death, Coolidge confided to an old friend: "I feel I no longer fit in with these times." Coolidge is buried in Plymouth Notch Cemetery, Plymouth Notch, Vermont. The nearby family home is maintained as one of the original buildings on the Calvin Coolidge Homestead District site. The State of Vermont dedicated a new visitors' center nearby to mark Coolidge's 100th birthday on July 4, 1972.

Radio, film, and commemorations

Despite his reputation as a quiet and even reclusive politician, Coolidge made use of the new medium of radio and made radio history several times while president. He made himself available to reporters, giving 520 press conferences, meeting with reporters more regularly than any president before or since. Coolidge's second inauguration was the first presidential inauguration broadcast on radio. On December 6, 1923, his speech to Congress was broadcast on radio, the first presidential radio address. Coolidge signed the Radio Act of 1927, which assigned regulation of radio to the newly created Federal Radio Commission. On August 11, 1924, Theodore W. Case, using the Phonofilm sound-on-film process he developed for Lee de Forest, filmed Coolidge on the White House lawn, making "Silent Cal" the first president to appear in a sound film. The title of the DeForest film was President Coolidge, Taken on the White House Grounds. When Charles Lindbergh arrived in Washington on a U.S. Navy ship after his celebrated 1927 trans-Atlantic flight, President Coolidge welcomed him back to the U.S. and presented him with the Medal of Honor; the event was captured on film.

See also
 
 Coolidge, Arizona
 Coolidge Dam
 List of things named after Calvin Coolidge
 Presidency of Calvin Coolidge

Notes

References

Works cited

About Coolidge and his era

By Coolidge

Further reading

 
 
 
 
 Postell, Joseph W. "Roaring Against Progressivism: The Principled Conservatism of Calvin Coolidge," in Joseph W. Postell and Johnathan O'Neill, eds.  Toward an American Conservatism: Constitutional Conservatism during the Progressive Era (2013) pp. 181–208.
 Russell, Francis. “Coolidge and the Boston Police Strike.” Antioch Review 16#4 (1956), pp. 403–15. online
 Tacoma, Thomas J. The Political Thought of Calvin Coolidge: Burkean Americanist (Lexington Books, 2020).
 Tacoma, Thomas. "Calvin Coolidge and the Great Depression: A New Assessment." Independent Review 24.3 (2019): 361–380. online
 Zibel, Howard J. "The Role of Calvin Coolidge in the Boston Police Strike of 1919," Industrial and Labor Relations Forum 6, no. 3 (November 1969): 299–318

Primary sources

External links

 White House biography
 
 Calvin Coolidge Presidential Library & Museum
 Calvin Coolidge Presidential Foundation
 Text of a number of Coolidge speeches, Miller Center of Public Affairs
 
 Calvin Coolidge: A Resource Guide, Library of Congress
 
 
 President Coolidge, Taken on the White House Ground, the first presidential film with sound recording
 
 "Life Portrait of Calvin Coolidge", from C-SPAN's American Presidents: Life Portraits, September 27, 1999
 Calvin Coolidge Personal Manuscripts
 
 
 

1872 births
1933 deaths
19th-century Congregationalists
20th-century American male writers
20th-century American non-fiction writers
20th-century Congregationalists
20th-century presidents of the United States
20th-century vice presidents of the United States
1920 United States vice-presidential candidates
American autobiographers
American Congregationalists
American lawyers admitted to the practice of law by reading law
American people of English descent
Amherst College alumni
Appleton family
Articles containing video clips
Burials in Vermont
Candidates in the 1920 United States presidential election
Candidates in the 1924 United States presidential election
College Republicans
Calvin
Deaths from coronary thrombosis
Governors of Massachusetts
Harding administration cabinet members
Lieutenant Governors of Massachusetts
Massachusetts city council members
Massachusetts lawyers
Massachusetts Republicans
Massachusetts state senators
Mayors of places in Massachusetts
Members of the Massachusetts House of Representatives
Native Americans' rights activists
Non-interventionism
Old Right (United States)
People from Plymouth, Vermont
Politicians from Northampton, Massachusetts
Presidents of the United States
Republican Party presidents of the United States
Republican Party governors of Massachusetts
Republican Party (United States) presidential nominees
Republican Party (United States) vice presidential nominees
Republican Party vice presidents of the United States
St. Johnsbury Academy alumni
Sons of the American Revolution
Vice presidents of the United States
Writers from Northampton, Massachusetts
Writers from Vermont
American anti-lynching activists